Adhemarius tigrina is a moth of the  family Sphingidae.

Distribution 
It is found from Peru to Venezuela. It has also been recorded in Bolivia. Subspecies coronata is found in Colombia.

Description 
The length of the forewings is 57–63 mm.

Biology 
 The species probably broods continuously, with records indicating adults are on wing from March to July and again in October.
 The larvae of ssp. tigrina probably feed on Ocotea veraguensis, Ocotea atirrensis, Ocotea sarah and Ocotea dendrodaphne. The larvae of ssp. coronata probably feed on Ocotea veraguensis, Ocotea atirrensis and Ocotea dendrodaphne.

Subspecies
Adhemarius tigrina tigrina (Peru to Venezuela and Bolivia)
Adhemarius tigrina coronata (Colombia)

References

External links
ssp. tigrina info
ssp. coronata info

Adhemarius
Moths described in 1874
Moths of South America